Colorado's 4th congressional district is a congressional district in the U.S. state of Colorado. Located in the eastern part of the state, the district encompasses most of the rural Eastern Plains as well as the larger Colorado Front Range cities of Loveland, Highlands Ranch, Castle Rock, and Parker.

The district is currently represented by Republican Ken Buck. With a Cook Partisan Voting Index rating of R+13, it is one of the most Republican districts in Colorado, especially since the 2012 redistricting removed Fort Collins from the district. No Democrat has received more than 40% of the vote as a US House candidate in the district since 2010.

History

1990s
Following the 1990 U.S. Census and associated realignment of Colorado congressional districts, the 4th Congressional district consisted of Baca, Bent, Cheyenne, Crowley, Elbert, Kiowa, Kit Carson, Larimer, Las Animas, Lincoln, Logan, Morgan, Otero, Phillips, Prowers, Sedgwick, Washington, Weld and Yuma counties, as well as portions of Adams and Arapahoe counties.

2000s
Following the 2000 U.S. Census and associated realignment of Colorado congressional districts, the 4th Congressional district consisted of Baca, Bent, Cheyenne, Crowley, Kiowa, Kit Carson, Larimer, Lincoln, Logan, Morgan, Phillips, Prowers, Sedgwick, Washington, Weld and Yuma counties, as well as portions of Boulder, and Otero counties.

2010s
Following the 2010 U.S. Census and associated realignment of Colorado congressional districts, the 4th Congressional district consisted of Baca, Bent, Cheyenne, Crowley, Elbert, Kiowa, Kit Carson, Las Animas, Lincoln, Logan, Morgan, Otero, Phillips, Prowers, Sedgwick, Washington, Weld and Yuma counties. The district also includes portions of Adams, Arapahoe, Boulder and Douglas counties and very little portions of Larimer County.

Characteristics
This district consists mainly of the area of Colorado that is part of the Great Plains region of the United States. It is largely rural.  The only large cities in the district are Loveland, Highlands Ranch, Castle Rock, and Parker.  Until the 2010s redistricting, Fort Collins was the largest city in the district and provided a large Democratic base, making the district somewhat competitive: before the 2020 redistricting, Greeley was the largest city in the district but has since been moved to the 8th district. 

While the 4th takes in some suburbs of the Democratic-leaning Denver metropolitan area, the 4th takes in the most Republican region of Metro Denver - Douglas County, the only Republican leaning county in the area: however, it is still far more friendly to the Democrats than the other counties in the district (especially in the blue-leaning cities of Highlands Ranch and Lone Tree) and is the only area in the district with any Democratic support of real significance. On the other hand, the district takes in some of the most Republican counties in Colorado, such as Washington, Kit Carson, and Rio Blanco, where Democrats rarely exceed even 20 percent of the vote. 

Historically, the district has been Republican-leaning, though Marilyn Musgrave won relatively narrow victories in 2004 and 2006 due to her Democratic opponents' strength in Fort Collins. Musgrave had to rely on strong performances in more conservative Greeley to hold onto her seat. In 2008, Musgrave lost reelection to Betsy Markey, who became the first Democrat to represent the district since the early 1970s. Markey was defeated in 2010 by Republican Cory Gardner, and the district was made more Republican in redistricting due to the removal of Fort Collins; no Democratic nominee has won more than 40% of the vote since she left office. 

George W. Bush received 58% of the vote in this district in 2004. John McCain narrowly carried the district in 2008 with 50% of the vote.

Voting
Election results from presidential races

List of members representing the district

Election results

1914

1916

1918

1920

1922

1924

1926

1928

1930

1932

1934

1936

1938

1940

1941 (Special)

1942

1944

1946

1948

1950

1952

1954

1956

1958

1960

1962

1964

1966

1968

1970

1972

1974

1976

1978

1980

1982

1984

1986

1988

1990

1992

1994

1996

1998

2000

2002

2004

2006

2008

2010

2012

2014

2016

2018

2020

2022

Historical district boundaries

See also

Colorado's congressional districts
List of United States congressional districts

References

 Congressional Biographical Directory of the United States 1774–present

External links
Interactive map of Colorado's 4th Congressional District

4
Eastern Plains
1915 establishments in Colorado